York Street, also known as The Jakemans Stadium for sponsorship purposes, is a football stadium in Boston, England, and was the former home of Boston United. Originally called Shodfriars Lane, football was first played on the site since the late 19th century by a variety of Boston teams, but it was only used by Boston United since 1933. In the late 1970s the ground was rebuilt. Although the ground currently had a maximum capacity of 6,643, the record crowd was 11,000 against Derby County. 10 further attendances of more than 8,000 are on record. Boston United left the York Street ground at the end of the 2019/20 season. In August 2021 Railway Athletic FC moved into the stadium.

History
The ground has stood in the centre of the town of Boston since the 19th century, and has been given a variety of names since its construction.  For 40 years before York Street's current tenants, Boston United were founded it was known as 'Main Ridge'.

In the mid-1950s the York Street Stand was built, and the ground's first floodlights were installed.  These were first played under in 1955, when over 9,000 fans watched Boston's first floodlit game against Corby Town.  The new floodlights, erected in each of the four corners of the ground, allowed the Pilgrims to play in various floodlit competitions.

In 1977 York Street failed an inspection for league grading, leading to local fundraising in 1978 which resulted in new terracing, stands, floodlights, toilets, turnstiles and snack bars.

In March 2009 Boston United F.C. announced that the ground had been renamed to 'The Jakemans Stadium', following a sponsorship deal with Sutterton-based Jakemans Confectioners

In August 2021, it was announced that Railway Athletic FC of the Boston & District League would begin playing matches at York Street.

Stands

Fantasy Island Stand
The Fantasy Island Stand is situated to the north of the pitch. It was entered through turnstiles 1 and 2 and has an all seated capacity of 1,323. It also held the Directors' seating and dugouts.

Benton Brothers York Street Stand
The Benton Brothers York Street Stand is situated to the east of the pitch. The right-hand side of this stand was reserved for away supporters, who were accommodated by flat terracing as well as the benches above.  Entry for this section was through turnstiles 3 and 4. Home supporters accessed the stand through turnstiles 5 and 6.  It is an unusual stand with both terracing near the pitch and seating above and behind. Its capacity is 1,435 with 503 seated. The players' changing rooms, tunnel, boardroom, medical centre and pressbox were housed here.

Spayne Road Terrace
The Spayne Road Terrace is situated to the south of the pitch. Turnstiles 5 and 6 were used for entry. It is a low terrace running the full length of the pitch with a capacity of 2,064.

The Jakemans Stand
The Town End Terrace is situated to the west of the pitch. Formerly reserved for away fans, it was allocated as a home stand.  Supporters entered through turnstiles 5, 6, 7, 8, 9 and 10. It has a maximum capacity of 1,821.

Ground grading
The ground has a Grade A certificate, meaning that it fulfils the Football League ground requirements. For this, the club had to install temporary seats in the centre of the Benton Brothers York Street End during their spell in the Football League, according to former Chairman Jon Sotnick.  The ground's Grade A status meant that all matches held there had to be segregated.

Lease
The ground was rented from the Malkinson family.  The land could not developed before the lease ends, unless Boston United no longer existed or had found an alternative home.  The land is owned by the Malkinson family, however the stands are owned by Boston United.

Other uses
The ground has been used for a variety of other purposes besides football matches. It is also currently used as the club's offices, and the Supporters' Trust hold meetings in its Boardroom. Public meetings have been held inside the ground, as have Community Days and fireworks displays.

'The Boston United Sports Bar' is located in the ground's car park. In March 2009 the club took over the running of the bar, which has provision for drinks, pool, and television.

York Street held its most recent international match on 5 March 2009.  England Under-18 Schoolboys beat Wales Under-18 Schoolboys 3–0, with a pre-match Japanese drum display and half-time cheer-leading routine taking place on the pitch.

Greyhound racing
Independent (unaffiliated to a governing body) greyhound racing took place around the pitch at Shodfriars Lane from 1932 until 1939. The company responsible for bringing greyhounds to the stadium were called the Boston Greyhound Racing Club. The first meeting was held on Wednesday 25 May 1932 and was attended by over 1,000.
Due to the outbreak of war the track was forced to close and never re-opened.

Transport

Road travel to the ground from outside the area is by the A1 and the A17 Sleaford to Boston road. From the town access to York Street is along John Adams Way and Main Ridge. The ground's car park is for permit holders only. Public parking is on the surrounding roads or at an NCP car park off John Adams Way.

References

Boston United F.C.
Football venues in England
Sports venues in Lincolnshire
Sports venues completed in 1933
English Football League venues
Defunct greyhound racing venues in the United Kingdom
Buildings and structures in Boston, Lincolnshire